The dredge Captain Meriwether Lewis is a U.S. National Historic Landmark. The dredge is one of the few surviving examples of its type built to control flooding and improve navigation along the nation's rivers.

History
Built by the Marietta Manufacturing Company in Point Pleasant, West Virginia, Captain Meriwether Lewis was launched on December 12, 1931 while only half-complete by the U.S. Army Corps of Engineers. The Corps completed construction the following year.

This side-wheel steam paddle dredge was operated by the U.S. Army Corps of Engineers to help channel the Missouri River and to maintain it as a navigable waterway.

This massive vessel, at a length of 268' 11-1/2", housed a standard operating crew of 52, with quarters available for 58 men. Captain Meriwether Lewis could dig to a depth of 20 feet at an average speed of 150–200 feet per hour, all powered by the 25-foot steam-propelled paddle wheels. With all three steam engines running, the dredge burned up to 6,000 gallons of oil in a day.

The Babcock & Wilcox marine boilers could produce up to 40,000 pounds of steam or more per hour when dredging. The triple expansion engine that drives the pump turbine is rated at 1,300 hp.  The dredge was pulled forward by the two deck gypsies and not propelled by the paddlewheels when dredging.

In 1976, Captain Meriwether Lewis was given to the Nebraska State Historical Society and moved to Brownville one year later. It was dry-berthed along the Missouri River where it remains today.

Captain Meriwether Lewis was designated a National Historic Landmark in 1989. Today, Captain Meriwether Lewis houses the Museum of Missouri River History, where exhibits from Native American history to exploration and westward expansion can be seen. Visitors can also learn about the vessel and its role in improving navigation on the Missouri River.

Museum of Missouri River History
The Nebraska State Historical Society took possession of the ship in 1976 and moved it to Brownville, Nebraska the next year.  The ship is dry-berthed along the Missouri River.  Visitors can tour the ship, which includes the Museum of Missouri River History, opened in 1981.   The museum's exhibits are located in several rooms of the boiler deck.  Exhibits include Native American history, area exploration, westward expansion, the ship and navigation on the river.

See also
List of U.S. National Historic Landmark ships, shipwrecks, and shipyards

References

External links
Official site

Ships on the National Register of Historic Places in Nebraska
National Historic Landmarks in Nebraska
Maritime museums in Nebraska
Museum ships in Nebraska
Dredgers
Museums in Nemaha County, Nebraska
National Register of Historic Places in Nemaha County, Nebraska
1932 ships